American Loggers is a television series on the Discovery Channel.  It was filmed in Maine, debuted in 2009, and went off the air in 2011 after three seasons.

Storyline
The show follows the Pelletier family from Millinocket, Maine. With their companies Gerald Pelletier, Inc and Pelletier Brothers, Inc they have a long tradition of logging in the North Maine Woods region of northern woods of Maine.

Meanwhile, the family has expanded the fields they work in. Trailer manufacturing and a restaurant business (now closed) and possibly insurance have been added to the business.

Reception
Common Sense Media rated the show 3 out of 5 stars.

References

External links 
 
 
 americanloggers.com the website of the Pelletier family

Discovery Channel original programming
Logging in the United States
Millinocket, Maine
North Maine Woods
English-language television shows
Economy of Maine
Television shows set in Maine
Television shows filmed in Maine
2009 American television series debuts
2011 American television series endings